Samuel Gardner was a representative in the Georgia Assembly during the Reconstruction Era. He was African American, a Republican, and represented Warren County, Georgia.

References

Republican Party members of the Georgia House of Representatives
African-American politicians during the Reconstruction Era
People from Warren County, Georgia
African-American state legislators in Georgia (U.S. state)
Original 33